Egini is a town in Udu LGA of Delta State, Nigeria near the city of Warri.

Populated places in Delta State